Raúl Goni Bayo (born 12 October 1988) is a Spanish former professional footballer who played as a central defender.

Club career
Goni was born in Zaragoza, Aragon. A product of Real Zaragoza's youth ranks, he made his first-team – and La Liga – debut on 31 October 2007 in a 1–0 away win against UD Almería, but spent his first two professional seasons, however, mainly registered with the reserves.

In the 2010–11 campaign, Goni played with Real Madrid Castilla of Segunda División B on loan, being regularly used during his spell (20 games in the regular season plus one in the playoffs) and subsequently returning to Zaragoza.

International career
Goni won his only cap in the Spain under-21 side on 10 February 2009, featuring 21 minutes as a starter in a 1–1 friendly draw to Norway held in Cartagena.

References

External links

1988 births
Living people
Footballers from Zaragoza
Spanish footballers
Association football defenders
La Liga players
Segunda División players
Segunda División B players
Tercera División players
Real Zaragoza B players
Real Zaragoza players
Real Madrid Castilla footballers
FC Cartagena footballers
CE Sabadell FC footballers
CD Teruel footballers
Spain youth international footballers
Spain under-21 international footballers